Chris Walker is an American musician and producer best known for his 1992 Billboard Hot 100 top 40 hit "Take Time".

Biography
Walker was born and raised in Houston, Texas, where he began singing before speaking. He got his start in the church as a member of his family gospel group, The Walker Brothers. Walker plays the bass upside down, similar to one of his guitar heroes, Jimi Hendrix.

Walker then moved to New York City, where he became Ornette Coleman's bass guitarist for two and a half years before releasing his debut album. He then toured with Regina Belle, where he soon became musical director. When Belle noticed his voice, she gradually worked his vocals into her act; Walker credits her for teaching him to find his voice.

Walker's 1991 debut album, First Time yielded two Top Five R&B hits, "Giving You All My Love" and "Take Time", which peaked at #29 on the Billboard Hot 100.

Walker then released his second album Sincerely Yours in 1993, which featured the single "How Do You Heal a Broken Heart" and has received over 59 million views on Youtube. As a solo artist, Walker remained absent from the public music scene for a decade, but he was hard at work and taking a new direction. Walker's music is popular in countries such as  South Africa and he performed there with Regina Belle in the Soul & Jazz Experience in 2019. He recently performed a sold-out show at the Sun Arena in Pretoria, honoring the late Eddie Zondi. His latest album We're In This Love Together - A Tribute to Al Jarreau will be released in May 2019 featuring artists like Gerald Albright, Regina Belle, Randy Brecker, Rick Braun, Will Downing, Nathan East, David Foster, Bob James, Paul Jackson Jr, Dave Koz, Bobby Lyle, Marcus Miller, Greg Phillinganes, Arturo Sandoval, Mark Simmons, Kirk Whalum and many more. This album was produced by Walker and Larry Williams.

Discography

Solo albums
1991: First Time
1993: Sincerely Yours
2005: I Know It's Love
2011: Zone
2019: We're In This Love Together - A Tribute to Al Jarreau

Solo singles
1991: "Giving You All My Love"
1992: "Take Time"
1992: "No Place Like Love"
1993: "Love Tonight"
1994: "How Do You Heal a Broken Heart"
2019: "We're In This Love Together"
2022: "Because I Love You"

References

Year of birth missing (living people)
American jazz bass guitarists
American male bass guitarists
Living people
American male singers
American rhythm and blues singers
Free funk musicians
High School for the Performing and Visual Arts alumni
American male jazz musicians